The Surat Agency was one of the agencies of British India in the Bombay Presidency.

History
This agency was formed in the 19th century as the Khandesh Agency, after the region of Khandesh, becoming the Surat Agency in 1880. Around 1900, the Dangs were incorporated, and in 1933, it was abolished and became part of the Baroda and Gujarat States Agency.

Finally in 1944, towards the end of the British Raj, the Baroda and Gujarat States Agency was merged with the Western India States Agency to form the larger Baroda, Western India and Gujarat States Agency.

The headquarters of the Surat Agency were at Surat, where the Political Agent who reported to the Political Department office in Bombay, used to reside.

States
The agency included three 9-gun salute princely states and the Dangs.

Salute States
Sachin
Bansda 
Dharampur

The Dangs
The Dangs were a group of small states in what is now the Dang district of Gujarat State.

See also
Western India States Agency

References

Agencies of British India
History of Gujarat
1933 disestablishments in India
1880 establishments in India
Bombay Presidency